Sir Cyril Wyche FRS (c.1632 – 28 December 1707) was an English lawyer and politician.

Early life
He was born in Constantinople, Turkey, where his father, Sir Peter Wyche, was the English Ambassador. He was educated at Christ Church, Oxford with Bachelor of Arts in 1653. He received his Master of Arts (MA) in 1655 and his Doctor of Civil Law (DCL) in 1665. Between the time he received his MA and his DCL, he was knighted (1660). This is so close in time to the English Restoration that he was almost certainly a Cavalier, and may have served in the military for the Royalist cause.

Career
He was an original member of the Royal Society and served as President from 1683–1684.

He joined the bar in 1670 and became Chief Secretary for Ireland in 1692. He was a Member of Parliament for several constituencies at different times, (MP for Callington (1661–1678), for East Grinstead (1681–1685), for Saltash (1685–1687), and for Preston (1702–1705)

Personal life
He married three times; firstly in 1663, Elizabeth, the daughter of Sir Thomas Jermyn of Rushbrooke, Suffolk, with whom he had 2 sons (1 of whom predeceased him) and 2 daughters, secondly in 1684 Susanna, the daughter of Sir Francis Norreys of Weston on the Green, Oxfordshire and the widow of Sir Herbert Perrott of Wellington. Herefordshire and thirdly in 1692 Mary, the daughter of George Evelyn of Wotton, Surrey. Mary was the niece of John Evelyn, the diarist.

Around 1690 he purchased Hockwold Hall (then called The Poynings) at Hockwold cum Wilton, Norfolk. He died there and a monument to him can be found in St Peter's Church, Hockwold.

See also
 List of presidents of the Royal Society

References

Further reading
 Sir Cyril Wyche and the Popish Plot, 1678-80, Hugh Fenning, O.P., in Seanchas Ard Macha volume 19/2, pp. 53–62, 2002
 Herbert Rix, "Wyche, Cyril", Dictionary of National Biography, 1885–1900, Volume 63

|-

1632 births
1707 deaths
Members of Gray's Inn
17th-century English lawyers
Original Fellows of the Royal Society
Members of the Privy Council of Ireland
Members of the Privy Council of England
Presidents of the Royal Society
Members of the pre-1707 English Parliament for constituencies in Cornwall
English MPs 1661–1679
English MPs 1681
English MPs 1685–1687
English MPs 1702–1705
Chief Secretaries for Ireland
Members of the Parliament of Ireland (pre-1801) for Dublin University
Irish MPs 1692–1693